Venancio Ariel Ramos Villanueva (born 20 June 1959) is a Uruguayan former football striker, who was nicknamed "Chicharra" during his professional career.

Club career
Ramos started his playing career in 1977 with Peñarol with whom he won several major championships including four Uruguayan Primera titles, the Copa Libertadores and Copa Intercontinental in 1982. 

In 1984, he joined French side Lens before returning to South America in 1986 to play for Independiente of Argentina.

Ramos returned to Uruguay in 1989 where he played for Racing Montevideo then Peñarol's fiercest rivals Nacional. In his later years he played for Defensor Sporting and finally El Tanque Sisley.

International career
He made his official international debut on May 24, 1978 against Spain (0-0), Ramos obtained a total number of 41 international caps for the Uruguay national football team. He represented his native country at the 1986 FIFA World Cup, wearing the number nineteen jersey.

Titles

Peñarol

Uruguayan First Division (4): 1978, 1979, 1981, 1982
Copa Libertadores (1): 1982
Intercontinental Cup (1): 1982

References
  Profile

Uruguayan footballers
Association football forwards
Uruguay under-20 international footballers
Uruguay international footballers
1979 Copa América players
1986 FIFA World Cup players
1959 births
Living people
Peñarol players
Uruguayan beach soccer players
Uruguayan Primera División players
RC Lens players
Ligue 1 players
Expatriate footballers in France
Club Atlético Independiente footballers
Argentine Primera División players
Expatriate footballers in Argentina
Racing Club de Montevideo players
Club Nacional de Football players
Defensor Sporting players
Uruguayan expatriate footballers
People from Artigas Department